Multipseudechiniscus raneyi is a species of tardigrade. It is the only species of Multipseudechiniscus, a genus within the family Echiniscidae.

The species was first described as Pseudechiniscus raneyi by Albert A. Grigarick, Franc Mihelčič & Robert O. Schuster in 1964. It was placed in the new genus Multipseudechiniscus in 2011. The species occurs in the western United States, in the states of California, Oregon and Montana.

References

Further reading
Grigarick, Mihelčič & Schuster, 1964 : New Tardigrada from western North America. 1. Pseudechiniscus. Proceedings of the Biological Society of Washington, vol. 77, p. 5-8

Echiniscidae
Invertebrates of the United States
Animals described in 1964
Endemic fauna of California
Biota of Oregon
Tardigrade genera
Monotypic protostome genera
Fauna without expected TNC conservation status